Katarzyna Kowalska (born 7 April 1985 in Lipno) is a Polish long-distance runner who specialises in the 3000 metres steeplechase. She represented Poland at the 2008 Olympic Games and 2012 Olympic Games and reached the final of the 2009 World Championships in Athletics. She also competed at the 2006 European Athletics Championships and the 2007, 2009, and 2013 World Championships.

Kowalska was Poland's best finisher at the 2010 IAAF World Cross Country Championships. She has won numerous medals at the under-23 level, including two golds at the European Athletics U23 Championships and a bronze at the European Cross Country Championships.

Career

Her first international competition was the 2004 IAAF World Junior Championships, where she finished fourth in her heats. Kowalska won the steeplechase gold at the 2005 European Athletics U23 Championships. In 2006, she won a bronze in the European Cup and at the 2006 European Athletics Championships, she recorded a personal best of 9:42.50 in the qualifiers before going on to finish ninth in the final. She represented Europe in the 5000 metres at the 2006 IAAF World Cup in Athens but finished in last place. She ran at the 2006 European Cross Country Championships in the under-23 race, and although she finished ninth, she headed Poland to the team silver medal.

She won the gold medal at the 2007 European Cup and retained her title at the 2007 European Athletics U23 Championships with a personal best run of 9:39.40. She made her first global appearance for Poland at the 2007 World Championships in Athletics later that year, getting eliminated in the heats stage. In December, she won the individual and team bronze medals in the under-23 competition at the 2007 European Cross Country Championships. She represented Poland at the 2008 Beijing Olympics but again failed to progress beyond the heats of the steeplechase. Having recorded a new personal best time of 9:26.93 in the heats, Kowalska reached her first global senior final at the 2009 World Championships in Athletics and finished in twelfth place. She was selected to run at the 2009 IAAF World Athletics Final and she finished eighth.

After winning the Polish Cross Country Championships in 2010, she attended the 2010 IAAF World Cross Country Championships in Bydgoszcz, Poland, and was the host's best performer with a 36th-place finish in the women's senior race.

Personal bests 

All information taken from IAAF profile.

Achievements

References

External links

1985 births
Living people
Polish female long-distance runners
Polish female steeplechase runners
Athletes (track and field) at the 2008 Summer Olympics
Athletes (track and field) at the 2012 Summer Olympics
Athletes (track and field) at the 2016 Summer Olympics
Olympic athletes of Poland
People from Lipno, Lipno County
Sportspeople from Kuyavian-Pomeranian Voivodeship
World Athletics Championships athletes for Poland